Bovevagh is a civil parish in County Londonderry, Northern Ireland.

Townlands
The civil parish contains the following townlands:

Ardinarive
Ballyharigan
Ballymoney
Bonnanaboigh
Bovevagh	
Camnish
Derryard
Derrylane
Derrynaflaw	
Derryork	
Drumadreen	
Drumaduff
Drumneechy	
Farkland
Flanders
Formil
Glebe
Glenconway
Gortaclare
Gortnahey Beg
Gortnahey More
Killibleught	
Leeke	
Muldonagh
Straw

See also
List of civil parishes of County Londonderry

References

Civil parishes of County Londonderry